Edward F. Ricketts State Marine Conservation Area is one of four small marine protected areas located near the cities of Monterey and Pacific Grove, at the southern end of Monterey Bay on California’s central coast.  The four areas together encompass .  Within SMCAs fishing and take of all living marine resources is prohibited except the recreational take of finfish by hook-and-line and the commercial take of giant and bull kelp under certain conditions.

History
The two State Marine Conservation Areas were established in September 2007 by the California Department of Fish & Game. They were two of 29 marine protected areas adopted during the first phase of the Marine Life Protection Act Initiative, which created a statewide network of marine protected areas along the California coastline.

Geography and natural features

Edward F. Ricketts State Marine Conservation Area is located off the coast of the Monterey Peninsula, at the southern end of Monterey Bay. It covers an area of .22 sq. miles.  The reserve is directly offshore from the Monterey Bay Aquarium and Cannery Row.
It was named for Edward F. Ricketts (1897–1948) who founded the Pacific Biological Laboratories in Monterey. 
It is the easternmost of four marine protected areas bordering the Monterey Peninsula.

The Lovers Point State Marine Reserve is adjacent to the west of Ricketts SMCA, and then beyond that the Pacific Grove Marine Gardens State Marine Conservation Area.

Farther south and west is the Asilomar State Marine Reserve.  All four areas are included within the Monterey Bay National Marine Sanctuary.

Habitat and wildlife
The Monterey Peninsula includes extensive tidepools brimming with life.  Its sandy beaches are used by pupping harbor seals, and dense kelp beds offshore  provide shelter for sea otters. SMCAs provide habitat for a variety of marine life, and includes kelp forest, beach, rocky intertidal, and soft and hard bottom.

Recreation 
The natural beauty and ocean resources of the Monterey Peninsula draw millions of visitors from around the world each year, including more than 65,000 scuba divers drawn by the area’s easy access, variety of wildlife, and massive kelp forests.

In addition to diving and visiting the aquarium, people enjoy the Monterey Bay by kayaking, whale watching, charter fishing, and eating an array of locally sourced seafood restaurants.

California’s marine protected areas encourage recreational and educational uses of the ocean.  Activities such as kayaking, diving, snorkeling, and swimming are allowed unless otherwise restricted.

Scientific monitoring
As specified by the Marine Life Protection Act, select marine protected areas along California’s central coast are being monitored by scientists to track their effectiveness and learn more about ocean health. Similar studies in marine protected areas located off of the Santa Barbara Channel Islands have already detected gradual improvements in fish size and number.
Local scientific and educational institutions involved in the monitoring include the Hopkins Marine Station *located between the two SMCAs), the Monterey Bay Aquarium Research Institute (MBARI), and Moss Landing Marine Laboratories. Research methods include hook-and-line sampling, scuba diver surveys, and the use of Remote Operated Vehicle (ROV) submarines.

References

External links

External links
Californias MPAs
Marine Life Protection Act Initiative
CalOceans

Marine sanctuaries in California
Monterey Bay
California Department of Fish and Wildlife areas
Protected areas of Monterey County, California
Monterey, California
Pacific Grove, California
2007 establishments in California
Protected areas established in 2007